Level 7 Diploma is a format of formalized postgraduate learning in the United Kingdom at the master level without an academic dissertation.

References

Educational qualifications in the United Kingdom
Academic degrees of the United Kingdom